In physics, there are equations in every field to relate physical quantities to each other and perform calculations. Entire handbooks of equations can only summarize most of the full subject, else are highly specialized within a certain field. Physics is derived of formulae only.

General scope

 Variables commonly used in physics
 Continuity equation
 Constitutive equation
 Defining equation (physics)

Specific scope

Defining equation (physical chemistry)
List of equations in classical mechanics
Table of thermodynamic equations
List of equations in wave theory
List of relativistic equations
List of equations in fluid mechanics
List of electromagnetism equations
List of equations in gravitation
List of photonics equations
List of equations in quantum mechanics
List of equations in nuclear and particle physics

See also

 List of equations
 Operator (physics)
 Laws of science

Units and nomenclature

 Physical constant
 Physical quantity
 SI units
 SI derived unit
 SI electromagnetism units
 List of common physics notations